Basildon Urban District (from 1934 to 1955 Billericay Urban District) was a local government district in south Essex, England from 1934 to 1974.

The district was created in 1934 from the following parishes (all from Billericay Rural District):

Basildon 
Bowers Gifford 
Great Burstead 
Laindon 
Lee Chapel 
Little Burstead (until 1938, to Thurrock Urban District)
Nevendon 
North Benfleet 
Pitsea 
Vange
Wickford

It also gained 1,282 acres (5 km2) from Chelmsford Rural District and 1,627 acres (7 km2) from Orsett Rural District.

In 1937 all the parishes were abolished and used to create a Billericay parish which occupied the same area as the district. In 1955 the district was renamed Basildon, still consisting of the Billericay parish.

References

Districts of England abolished by the Local Government Act 1972
Borough of Basildon
Urban districts of England
1934 establishments in England